Tjugum is a village in Sogndal Municipality in Vestland county, Norway. The village is located on the northern shore of the Sognefjorden, at the mouth of the Esefjorden, and near the mouth of the Fjærlandsfjorden. Tjugum is the site of Tjugum Church, which serves the northern part of the municipality.

Tjugum sits along Norwegian County Road 55, just west of Dragsvik, where the Norwegian National Road 13 crosses the Sognefjorden by car ferry.

References

Villages in Vestland
Sogndal